Shrieker is a 1998 American horror film directed by David DeCoteau and produced by Charles Band.

Plot
Clark (Tanya Dempsey), a young Mathematics major at a University, thinks she's found the best deal for student housing: a group of squatters who live in an abandoned hospital secretly. The quirky residents let her into their community provided she follow the rules, including not telling anyone about her living arrangements. All seems wonderful, until she discovers that the reason that the hospital was abandoned was a series of murders in the 1940s by a strange "shrieking killer" who was never captured - and the discovery that someone who's living in the hospital is using occult means to bring back the demonic "Shrieker".

Cast
Tanya Dempsey as Clark
Parry Shen
Jenya Lano
Jason-Shane Scott
Jamie Gannon
Alison Cuffe
Roger Crowe
Chris Boyd
Brannon Gould
Rick Buono

Release
Shrieker was released on DVD by Wizard on March 3, 1998. It was later re-released in both 2003 and 2007 by Full Moon Home Video and Vision Films respectively.

Reception 
The Tubi Tuesdays Podcast stated in Episode 13 that Shrieker is a confusing mess of a film, with the sub-plot of students squatting in an abandoned hospital made no sense.

References

External links
 
 
 

1998 films
1990s monster movies
American supernatural horror films
1998 horror films
Films directed by David DeCoteau
American monster movies
Squatting in film
1990s English-language films
1990s American films